The 2008 Monza Superbike World Championship round was the fifth round of the 2008 Superbike World Championship. It took place on the weekend of May 9–11, 2008 at the Monza circuit.

Superbike race 1 classification

Superbike race 2 classification

Supersport race classification

Monza Round
Monza